William John Napier, 9th Lord Napier, Baron Napier FRSE (13 October 1786 – 11 October 1834) was a British Royal Navy officer and trade envoy in China.

Early life 
Napier was born in Kinsale, Ireland, on 13 October 1786. He was the son of Francis Napier, 8th Lord Napier (1758–1823) and the father of Francis Napier, 10th Lord Napier and 1st Baron Ettrick (1819–1898).

He enlisted in the Royal Navy in 1803 and served - with distinction - as a midshipman on HMS Defiance at the Battle of Trafalgar (1805). He later served as lieutenant under Thomas Cochrane, 10th Earl of Dundonald.

Career 

In 1818 he was elected a Fellow of the Royal Society of Edinburgh. His proposers were Sir David Brewster, Sir George Steuart Mackenzie, and John Playfair.

A peer of Scotland, Lord Napier was an elected Scottish representative in the House of Lords from 1824 to 1832. In December 1833, upon the ending of British East India Company's monopoly on trade in the Far East, he was appointed by Foreign Secretary Lord Palmerston, a family friend of Napier, as the first Chief Superintendent of Trade at Canton (now Guangzhou), in China. The Second and Third Superintendents were John Francis Davis and Sir George Best Robinson, respectively. He arrived at Macau on 15July 1834 on board the East India Company frigate Andromanche, and reached Canton ten days later, with the mission of expanding British trade into inner China. Lacking the necessary diplomatic and commercial experience, he was not successful in achieving the objective.

Having failed to secure a meeting with Lu Kun, the Governor-general of the Liangguang, because of Napier's rigid demands contravening longstanding protocols, Napier's frustration led to his favoring a military intervention as personal retribution.  He sent the frigates Andromache and Imogene to Whampoa on 11 September, defying an edict issued by Lu Kun, in a 'casualty-less' skirmish of cannon fire as the British warships breached defences at the Bocca Tigris.  After a prolonged stalemate, Lord Napier, sapped by typhus, was forced to retire to Macau in September 1834, where he died of the fever on 11October. Originally buried in Macau, he was later exhumed for reburial at Ettrick in Scotland.

Napier was the first British representative to suggest seizing Hong Kong. In a dispatch to Lord Palmerston on 14 August 1834, he suggested a commercial treaty, backed by an armed force, be done to secure the rights and interests of European merchants in China. He recommended that a small British force "should take possession of the Island of Hongkong, in the eastern entrance of the Canton River, which is admirably adapted for every purpose".

Family

Lord Napier married Elizabeth Cochrane-Johnstone (c. 1795–1883), daughter of Scottish adventurer Andrew Cochrane-Johnstone, in 1816; they had two sons and six daughters. His eldest son, Francis Napier, also entered diplomatic service and was promoted by Palmerston for the rest of his life.

Honours 
Following his death, 120 years later, the British Government placed a memorial to him before the Macao Customs Office.  After being lost for a short time, it was moved to the Hong Kong Cemetery, and then to the Hong Kong Museum of History, where it now rests.

Notes

Further reading
Eitel, E. J. (1895). Europe in China: The History of Hongkong from the Beginning to the Year 1882. London: Luzac & Company.
 
Hoe, Susanna; Roebuck, Derek (1999). The Taking of Hong Kong: Charles and Clara Elliot in China Waters. Richmond, Surrey: Curzon Press. .
 Melancon, Glenn. "Peaceful Intentions: The First British Trade Commission in China, 1833-5,” Historical Research 73 (2000) password required.
 Morse, Hosea Ballou. International Relations of the Chinese Empire: The Period of Conflict: 1834-1860. (1910) online pp 118-144
 
 Welsh, Frank; Rao, Maya (1996). A Borrowed Place: The History of Hong Kong''. .

External links 

The Napier Affair (1834)
Another description of the Napier Affair

1786 births
1834 deaths
William Napier, 9th Lord
Royal Navy officers
Royal Navy personnel of the Napoleonic Wars
Scottish representative peers
Lords Napier
Eldest sons of British hereditary barons